Rukuba (also Ungwan Rukuba) is a district in Jos North Local Government Area of Plateau State in the Middle Belt region of Nigeria. The postal code for the area is 930.

People and language
The indigenous people of the area are the Bache people who speak Kuche, a Ninzic language.

See also
 List of villages in Plateau State

References

Populated places in Plateau State